The 2012 Southern Conference baseball tournament took place at Fluor Field at the West End in Greenville, South Carolina, from May 23 through 27.  The final game was televised on ESPN3

The tournament used a double-elimination format.

Samford went 4–0 to win the tournament, clinching the conference's automatic berth in the 2012 NCAA Division I baseball tournament and the school's first ever Regional appearance. 2012 also marks the school's first baseball championship since joining the Southern Conference in 2008.

Seeding

 Appalachian State earned the tiebreaker over College of Charleston after winning the regular season series 8–6, 8–2, 3-8
 The Citadel earned the tiebreaker over Furman after winning the regular season series 7–0, 3–1, 6-8

Results

 As tournament host, game order and times would have been adjusted to allow Furman to play the 5:00 pm game as long as it remained in the winner's bracket.
 * denotes extra innings
 The first-round game between Georgia Southern and Elon tied the Southern Conference Tournament record for largest margin of victory at 17.
 The first round elimination game between Elon and College of Charleston broke the Southern Conference Tournament record with 39 combined hits (21 for Elon, 18 for College of Charleston).
 The championship game was a rematch of the 2011 championship game where Georgia Southern defeated Samford 1–0.

All-Tournament Team

References

SoCon Tournament
Southern Conference Baseball Tournament
Southern Conference Tournament
Southern Conference baseball tournament
Baseball competitions in Greenville, South Carolina
College baseball tournaments in South Carolina